Irene "Rena" Vlahopoulou (Greek: Ειρήνη (Ρένα) Βλαχοπούλου; 28 July 1917 – 29 July 2004) was a Greek actress and singer. She starred in theatre, musical, and Greek cinema productions, including The Gambler and The Countess of Corfu.

Biography
Vlahopoulou was born on the island of Corfu, the fifth of nine children. She first began playing the piano, taught by her father, Giannis Vlahopoulos. When she turned ten, she began singing at a local bakery; she was a talented dancer and actress and a qualified mezzo-soprano. Over the course of her fifty-five-year career she appeared in 105 theatrical plays between 1939 and 1994, and twenty-six films between 1951 and 1985.

In 1939, Vlahopoulou and AEK Athens footballer, Kostas Vasiliou eloped to Athens and were married. She began singing at the Oasis varieté show in the Zappeion gardens, where Mimis Traiforos presented his new work. In the winter of 1930–40, she sang at the World Theatre of Kostas Makedos on Panepistimiou Street.

The marriage with Vasiliou ended. In 1942 she married her second husband, a banker, Giannis Kostopoulos; the couple divorced in 1946. She married her third and final husband, Giorgos Lafazanis, on 18 September 1967. They remained wed until her death in 2004. Vlahopoulou had no children by any of her marriages. She left Finos Film in 1966 and moved to Karagiannis-Karatzopoulos. From 1972, she continued to star in films for the next seven years. In 1992–93, she starred in the musical comedy Gia Tin Ellada Re Gamo To (Για την Ελλάδα ρε γαμώ το), after which she retired.

Filmography
1951: Anatolitikes nyhtes (Ανατολίτικες νύχτες; Oriental Nights)
1956: The Girl from Corfu (Πρωτευουσιάνικες περιπέτειες; Capital adventures) ..... Rinoula
1962: Otan leipei i gata (Όταν λείπει η γάτα; When the cat's away) ..... Marigo
1962: Merikoi to protimoun kryo (Μερικοί το προτιμούν κρύο; Some like it Cold) ..... Rena Angelou
1963: Ena koritsi gia dyo (Ένα κορίτσι για δύο; One Girl for Two) ..... Polyxeni
1963: Kati na kaiei (Κάτι να καίει; Something Is Burning) ..... Sofia Frantzi
1964: I hartopehtra (Η Χαρτοπαίκτρα; The Gambler) ..... Aleka Oikonomidou
1964: Koritsia gia filima (Κορίτσια για φίλημα; Girls Fit for Kissing) ..... Rena Eleftheriou
1965: Fonazi o kleftis (Φωνάζει ο κλέφτης; The Thief Is Screaming) ..... Lia Karaleontos
1966: Randevou ston aera (Ραντεβού στον αέρα; Date in the air) ..... Jenny Stathatos / Rena Vlahopoulou
1966: I vouleftina (Βουλευτίνα; Lady MP) ..... Rena Varlamou
1967: Viva Rena (Βίβα Ρένα; Viva Rena) ..... Rena Papaliou / Pepita di Corfu
1970: Mia treli sarantara (Μια τρελή σαραντάρα; A Crazy 40-year-old) ..... Jenny Petromihali
1968: I ziliara (Ζηλιάρα; Jealous) ..... Rena Pantelia
1969: I Pariziana (Παριζιάνα; Parisienne) ..... Pelagia Karaboubouna
1970: I theia mou i hipissa (Η θεία μου η χίπισσα; My hippie aunt ) ..... Leni
1970: Mia Ellinida sto haremi (Ελληνίδα στο χαρέμι; A Greek woman in the harem) ..... Rena
1971: Ziteitai epeigontos gambros (Ζητείται επειγόντως γαμπρός; Bridegroom sought urgently) ..... Rena
1972: I komissa tis Kerkyras (Η κόμησσα της Κέρκυρας The Countess of Corfu) ..... Siora Antzolina
1972: I Rena einai offside (Η Ρένα είναι οφσάιντ; Rena Is Offside) ..... Rena Kaplani
1979: Oi fantarines (Φανταρίνες; Women soldiers) ..... Captain Evgenia Vrahou
1980: Rena na i efkairia (Ρένα να η ευκαιρία; Rena, this is your chance) ..... Rena Apostolou
1981: Tis politsmanas to kangelo (Της πολιτσμάνας το κάγκελο; Crazy policewoman) ..... Rena
1982: I manoula, to manouli ki o paidaros (Η μανούλα, το μανούλι κι ο παίδαρος, Momma, chick and hunk) ..... Rena
1983: I sidira kyria (Η σιδηρά κυρία; Iron Lady) ..... Rena Remoundou
1985: Rena ta resta sou (Ρένα τα ρέστα σου; Rena, your Change) ..... Rena Verygiou

Death 
Vlahopoulou passed away at 7pm on Thursday 29th July 2004 at the Athens Medical Center. She had entered the Medical Center on 16th July to undergo surgery as she suffered from a perforated stomach. Her medical report listed the cause of her death as cardiac arrest. on 30th July 2004, her body was showcased in a popular pilgrimage to the chapel of Agios Lazarus in the First Cemetery of Athens. Her funeral was held at public expense on Saturday 31st July 2004. She was accompanied by the band of the Philharmonic Society that came from Corfu. Many of her colleagues and ordinary people from all over Greece came to mourn over a beloved greek actress. On the day of her funeral, all shops in Corfu remained closed as a sign of respect as well as mourning.

In September of 2016, Rena Vlahopoulou's luxury home in the Dasia area of Corfu was sold to a greek construction company to be renovated and rented out.

References

External links
 

1917 births
2004 deaths
20th-century Greek actresses
20th-century Greek women singers
Actors from Corfu
Greek film actresses
Greek actresses
Greek stage actresses
Greek laïko singers
Musicians from Corfu
Gold Crosses of the Order of the Phoenix (Greece)